Cephas may refer to:

Religion
The title of Saint Peter
Diocese of Cephas, an ancient episcopal seat of the Roman province of Mesopotamia, in present-day Tur Abdin, Turkey
Cephas of Iconium, among the Seventy Disciples of Jesus, bishop of Iconium or Colophon, Pamphylia
Moses Bar Cephas or Moses Bar-Kepha (c. 813–903), Syriac writer and bishop of the Syriac Orthodox Church

People

Given name
Cephas Yao Agbemenu (born 1951), Ghanaian sculptor and a traditional African wood carver and Art Professor
Céphas Bansah (born 1948), Ngoryifia ("developmental chief") of the Gbi Traditional area of Hohoe, Ghana
Cephas Chimedza (born 1984), Zimbabwean footballer
Cephas Lemba (born 1970), Zambian sprinter
Cephas Lumina, Zambian lawyer and human rights expert
Cephas Malele (born 1994), Angolan-born Swiss footballer
Cephas Matafi (born 1971), Zimbabwean long-distance runner
Cephas Mark (1872–1942), Canadian druggist and political figure
Cephas Msipa (1931–2016), Zimbabwean politician
Cephas Pasipamiri, Zimbabwean long distance and marathon runner
Cephas Quested, leader of the Aldington Gang, a 19th-century band of smugglers in England
Cephas Thompson (1775–1856), American itinerant portrait painter
Cephas Washburn (1793–1860), Christian missionary and educator 
Cephas Zhuwao (born 1984), Zimbabwean cricketer
Cephas Fianyeku (born 1979) Ghanaian Banker and criminologist

Middle name
Collen Cephas Gwiyo, Zimbabwean politician and deputy secretary general of the Zimbabwe Congress
Edward Cephas John Stevens (1837–1915), New Zealand politician
Jasmine Cephas Jones (born 1989), American actress
Ron Cephas Jones (born 1957), American actor

Surname
Diana Cephas, African American plaintiff in freedom suit
Kassian Cephas (1845–1912), Javanese photographer
McColm Cephas (born 1978), Liberian footballer

Other uses
Cephas & Wiggins, an American acoustic blues duo